Samuel Conners (born 13 February 1999) is an English cricketer. He was born in Nottingham and attended George Spencer Academy in Stapleford, Nottinghamshire. In July 2018, he played for the England under-19 cricket team against South Africa, before signing a two-year deal with Derbyshire.

He made his first-class debut on 26 March 2019 for Derbyshire against Leeds/Bradford MCCU, as part of the Marylebone Cricket Club University fixtures. He made his List A debut on 24 April 2019 for Derbyshire in the 2019 Royal London One-Day Cup. He made his Twenty20 debut on 30 August 2020, for Derbyshire in the 2020 t20 Blast.

In April 2021, Conners took his maiden five-wicket haul in first-class cricket, with 5/83 against Durham in the 2021 County Championship.

References

External links
 

1999 births
Living people
English cricketers
Derbyshire cricketers
Place of birth missing (living people)
Cricketers from Nottingham